Amagon, known in Japan as , is a side-scrolling platform action game for the Nintendo Entertainment System developed by Aicom.

Synopsis
In the game, players take the role of Amagon, a Marine who is trapped on an island after his plane crashed. Inconveniently, his rescue ship is on the other side of the island, which Amagon must now cross on foot.

The storyline used for the original Japanese release was somewhat different. The main character is a scientist named "Jackson" who transforms into his "Macho Man" form by using the special drug "Macho Max" that has been taken from his plane by the creatures of "Monster Island".

Gameplay

Amagon encounters a variety of enemies which he can dispose of with his rifle.  He also has the ability (upon collecting and then activating the Mega-Key) to transform into a larger, stronger version of himself called "Megagon". Upon transformation, Megagon is given 1 hit point for every 5,000 points he scored as Amagon (whereas a single hit from any enemy or hazard will kill Amagon). Megagon cannot use the machine gun, but instead has a punch which does eight times the damage and never runs out of ammo. At the cost of one hit point each, he can also fire waves of energy from his chest; these are much broader than machine gun shots, do 16 times the damage, and can hit multiple enemies in a single blast.

The last boss in the game is based on the Flatwoods monster, a supposed space alien seen in Flatwoods, West Virginia on September 12, 1952.

Reception
Allgame gave Amagon a score of 2 stars of out of a possible 5. Just Games Retro assigned the video game a score of 40% (F) in their April 5, 2007 review of this game while Game Freaks 365 gave the video game a score of 78% (B+) in their 2005 overview of the game.

References

1988 video games
Aicom games
Nintendo Entertainment System games
Nintendo Entertainment System-only games
Platform games
Side-scrolling video games
Vic Tokai games
Video games developed in Japan
Video games set on islands
Single-player video games